The Mercedes-Benz M272 engine is an automobile piston V6 engine family used in the 2000s (decade). Introduced in 2004, it is based on the M112 V6 introduced in 1998.

All M272 engines have aluminum engine blocks with a 90° V-angle with silicon/aluminum lined cylinders. The aluminum DOHC cylinder heads have 4 valves per cylinder. All have forged steel connecting rods, one-piece cast crankshaft, iron-coated aluminum pistons and a magnesium intake manifold. Like the M112, a balance shaft is installed in the engine block between the cylinder banks to deal with vibrations in the 90 degree V6 design. This essentially eliminates first and second order moments. A dual-length Variable Length Intake Manifold is fitted to optimize engine flexibility.

Continuous VVT was adopted for the first time. Featured on both the intake and exhaust camshafts, each can be varied through a range of 40 degrees. The twin spark plug system was replaced by a regular single spark plug per cylinder. New electronic coolant flow control has replaced the mechanical thermostat for improved engine warm-up and optimum control of engine temperature. Also tumble flaps are used to improve output at low engine speeds.

E25

The E25 is a  version.

Applications:
 2005–2007 W203 C 230 
 2007–2009 W204 C 230
 2005–2009 W211 E 230
 2008–2011 CL203 CLC 230
 2010–2012 W639 Viano (Chinese market; known as the M272 924)
 2010–2011 W639 Vito (Chinese market; known as the M272 924)

E30

The E30 is a  version.

Applications:
 2004–2010 R171 SLK 280
 2005–2010 W219 CLS 280 / CLS 300
 2005–2010 C209 CLK 280
 2005–2007 W203 C 280 / C 280 4MATIC
 2007–2009 W204 C 280 / C 280 4MATIC
 2009–2011 W204 C 300 / C 300 4MATIC
 2008-2012 X204 GLK 300 4MATIC
 2005–2009 W211 E 280 / E 280 4MATIC
 2009–2011 W212 E 300
 2005–2009 R230 SL 280
 2005–2013 W639 Vito
 2006–2009 W251 R 280
 2007–2013 W221 S 300
 2013–2015 W639 Viano (Chinese market; known as the M272 939)
 2013–2015 W639 Vito (Chinese market; known as the M272 939)

E35

The E35 is a  version. A direct injected variant debuted in 2006 under the name Stratified-Charged Gasoline Injection (CGI). This was achieved by raising the rev-limit to 7200 rpm, increasing the compression ratio using enhanced, weight-optimized pistons with a curved surface, reinforcements in the area of the piston pins, deeper pockets for the valve seats, single-stage intake manifold, lightweight valves with sodium cooling, conical valve springs, tri-oval chain sprocket, and a new cylinder head.

Applications:
 2004–2011 R171 SLK 350
 2004–2010 W219 CLS 350
 2005–2010 C209 CLK 350
 2009–2011 C207 E350
 2005–2007 W203 C 350 / C 350 4MATIC
 2007–2011 W204 C 350 / C 350 4MATIC
 2005–2009 W211 E 350 / E 350 4MATIC
 2009–2011 W212 E 350 / E 350 4MATIC
 2005–2011 W221 S 350 / S 350 4MATIC
 2005–2012 R230 SL 350
 2006–2017 W251 R 350
 2006–2011 W164 ML 350
 2005–2014 W639 Viano (known as the M272 978 in China)
 2006–2013 NCV3 Sprinter
 2008–2011 CL203 CLC 350
 2008–2012 X204 GLK 350 4MATIC

Balance shaft gear and other issues

These complaints led to a class action lawsuit against Mercedes-Benz (Greg Suddreth and Paul Dunton v. Mercedes-Benz USA, LLC), which alleged the M272 engines are equipped with defective balance shafts gears which "wear out prematurely, excessively and without warning, purportedly causing the vehicles to malfunction, the check engine light to illuminate and the vehicle to misfire and/or stop driving." The suit further alleged that Mercedes knew of this problem, sending out repair bulletins on how to address this issue and ultimately changing the balance shaft gears to avoid this problem. This suit was ultimately dismissed with the judge agreeing with Mercedes that because the gears fail at 60 -80K miles and outside of the warranty period, Mercedes is not legally responsible for these problems.

However, a second class action lawsuit was filed in October 2012 in Northern California, covering Mercedes-Benz models manufactured between 2005 and 2007.  A preliminary settlement was reached on April 8, 2015,  which would see owners compensated for up to 70% of the cost of the repair.

These engines also have a common issue with their intake manifolds. The M273 also has similar issues but not to the same extent. The plastic lever that operates the opening and closing of the variable length intake manifold can break prematurely. Mercedes doesn't have this particular part listed, instead they sell the whole intake manifold as one unit which can cost upwards of $800 US. There are a number of third-party companies that sell a replacement lever made out of metal at a much cheaper cost.

See also

 List of Mercedes-Benz engines

External links
 https://web.archive.org/web/20160115082755/http://www.emercedesbenz.com/Feb06/24WorldPremierOfMercedesCLS30CGI.html
 http://www.autospeed.com/cms/A_2084/article.html

References

M272
V6 engines
Gasoline engines by model